Act of Depression is the debut studio album by American rock band Underoath. Released July 4, 1999, through Takehold Records, the album was out of print for some time as there were only 2,000 copies originally released. Solid State reissued this album alongside Cries of the Past on August 20, 2013.

Musical content and style

The style of this album has been described as metalcore with death metal influences.

The hidden track "Spirit of a Living God" begins with commentary by lead guitarist Corey Steger speaking about his description about God, talks about receiving Jesus Christ and that he dedicates the album to those that were victims to rape, suicide and depression. It features drummer Aaron Gillespie in the background of the commentary singing along with an acoustic guitar. After 15 seconds of silence (3:47 - 4:02), the song itself starts; it is an acoustic rock song that features singing vocals by Gillespie.

Reception
Act of Depression overall received mixed reviews.

Casey Boland of Alternative Press stated that the album sounds "hopelessly dated" by modern standards and that the songs are "complicated seemingly for the sake of being complicated." Boland wrote the album has "flashes of brilliance" but "doesn’t have the creative legs to stand the test of time." Boland concluded his review by saying "Despite its many flaws, Act Of Depression is a curious look at the humble beginnings of an influential band."

Opening track, "Heart of Stone", would later appear on the band's 2012 compilation Anthology: 1999–2013.

Track listing

Personnel
Underoath
Dallas Taylor – lead vocals
Corey Steger – guitar, additional vocals
Octavio Fernandez – bass
Aaron Gillespie – drums, backing vocals on "A Love So Pure", lead vocals on "Spirit of a Living God"
Production
Produced by James Paul Wisner

References

Underoath albums
1999 debut albums
Solid State Records albums
Death metal albums by American artists